Stade Dudelange was a football club from Dudelange, in southern Luxembourg.  It is now a part of F91 Dudelange, which was formed by the merger of Stade, Alliance Dudelange, and US Dudelange in 1991.

Stade was one of the country's most successful clubs, winning 10 National Division championships and four Luxembourg Cup titles; to this day, the former is the third-greatest haul by any club behind Jeunesse Esch and the defunct CA Spora Luxembourg.  In its heyday of the late 1940s, Stade won four consecutive National Division titles. Including two championships won before World War II interrupted domestic play, Stade won a string of six consecutive titles, a feat that has never been matched.

During World War II, Luxembourg was annexed by Germany and the club became part of German football competition. Playing as FV Stadt Düdelingen they were part of the top flight Gauliga Moselland. The team captured the divisional title there in 1942 and advanced to the German national playoffs where they were put out by the dominant side of the era, FC Schalke 04, who were on their way to the championship.

Honours
National Division
Winners (10): 1938–39, 1939–40, 1944–45, 1945–46, 1946–47, 1947–48, 1949–50, 1954–55, 1956–57, 1964–65
Runners-up (6): 1919–20, 1922–23, 1924–25, 1927–28, 1955–56, 1959-60

Luxembourg Cup
Winners (4): 1937–38, 1947–48, 1948–49, 1955–56
Runners-up (8): 1927–28, 1935–36, 1938–39, 1939–40, 1946–47, 1956–57, 1957–58, 1959–60

Gauliga Moselland
Winners (1): 1941–42

Footnotes

Stade Dudelange
Defunct football clubs in Luxembourg
Sports teams in Dudelange
Association football clubs established in 1913
Association football clubs disestablished in 1991
1913 establishments in Luxembourg
1991 disestablishments in Luxembourg